= 2014 NHL season =

The 2014 NHL season may refer to:

- 2013–14 NHL season, which began in 2013 and finished in 2014
- 2014–15 NHL season, which began in 2014 and finished in 2015
